The 1954 Purdue Boilermakers football team was an American football team that represented Purdue University during the 1954 Big Ten Conference football season. In their eighth season under head coach Stu Holcomb, the Boilermakers compiled a 5–3–1 record, finished in approximately sixth place in the Big Ten Conference with a 3–3 record against conference opponents, and outscored opponents by a total of about 165 to 134.

Notable players on the 1954 Purdue team included quarterback Len Dawson, guard Tom Bettis, and end John Kerr.

Schedule

Roster

References

Purdue
Purdue Boilermakers football seasons
Purdue Boilermakers football